Karapınar is a town and district of Konya Province in the Central Anatolia region of Turkey. According to 2000 census, population of the district is 55,734 of which 35,285 live in the town of Karapınar. Volcanic Karapınar Field is located nearby.

See also
Karapınar coal mine
Karapınar Field
Karapınar Renewable Energy Resource Area

Notes

References

External links
Karapınar Selimiye Külliyesi, Archnet
 District governor's official website 
 District municipality's official website 

Towns in Turkey
Populated places in Konya Province
 
Districts of Konya Province